Edgar Neville Romrée, Count of Berlanga de Duero (28 December 1899 – 23 April 1967) was a Spanish playwright and film director, a member of the "other" Generation of '27.

Biography
Neville was born in Madrid but lived in Hollywood in the 1930s, in the period of the dubbed Spanish versions of the studios' English-language films. He wrote dialogue for MGM's Spanish language films, and won acclaim for his script adapted from George Hill's The Big House (1930). During the Spanish Civil War, Neville made a few short propaganda films for the Nationalist side. He also made three movies in Rome. The films he directed in the 1940s and 1950s mixed realism and romanticism, but did not perform particularly well at the box-office.  He was captain of the Spain men's national ice hockey team at the 1924 Ice Hockey European Championship and also played at the 1926 Ice Hockey European Championship.

Family

Parents
His father was Edward Neville Riddlesdale, an English engineer who was director of his family's engine company in Spain (Julius G. Neville & Co, Liverpool, later the Anglo-Spanish Motor Company). His mother was Mary Romrée y Palacios, daughter of Count and Countess de Berlanga de Duero, a title he would later inherit.

Marriage
Edgar Neville married Ángeles Rubio Argüelles y Alessandri. Their son, Raphael Neville, Count of Berlanga de Duero (11 August 1926 – December 1996) was a painter who, in 1958, created a seaside resort in Sardinia, called "Porto Rafael", where his birthday is still celebrated every year on 11 August. Upon his return to Spain, Neville directed La señorita de Trevélez, and it was hailed one of the best films of its time.

Filmography
El presidio (The Jail, 1930)
 Take Me to Hollywood (1931)
Do, Re, Mi, Fa, Sol, La, Si, o La vida privada de un tenor (1934)
 The Wicked Carabel (1935)
 The Lady from Trévelez (1936)
Juventudes de España (1938)
 Bound for Cairo (1935)
La ciudad universitaria (1938)
Vivan los hombres libres (1939)
Carmen fra i rossi/Frente de Madrid (1939)
Santa Rogelia (1939)
Madrid Carnival (1941)
Sancta Maria (1942)
La parrala (1942)
Correo de Indias (1942)
Café de París (1943)
The Tower of the Seven Hunchbacks (1944)
Carnival Sunday (1945)
Life on a Thread (1945)
The Crime of Bordadores Street (1946)
 The Bullfighter's Suit (1947)
Nada (1947)
El marqués de Salamanca (1948)
El señor Esteve (1948)
The Last Horse (1950)
Cuento de hadas (1951)
 Devil's Roundup (1952)
Flamenco (1952)
La ironía del dinero (1955)
The Dance  (1959)
My Street (1960)

Novels, plays and other writings
Don Clorato de Potasa (1929)
Margarita y los hombres (1934)
El baile (1952)
La niña de la calle del Arenal (prologue by actor Jesús García de Dueñas, 1953)
Torito bravo (novella, 1955)
Mi España particular (travel book, 1957)
La piedrecita (play in three acts, 1957)
Alta fidelidad (comic play in two acts, 1960)
Flamenco y cante jondo (1963)
Las terceras de ABC (ABC articles compendium, published posthumously by Editorial Prensa Española in 1976)

References

Bibliography

External links

 
 Página oficial de Edgar Neville
 
 Edgar Neville filmography, New York Times; accessed 29 October 2014.

1899 births
1967 deaths
Film directors from Madrid
Spanish male dramatists and playwrights
Spanish film producers
20th-century Spanish painters
20th-century Spanish male artists
Spanish male painters
Counts of Spain
Generation of '27
Writers from Madrid
Male screenwriters
20th-century Spanish dramatists and playwrights
Spanish people of English descent
20th-century Spanish male writers
20th-century Spanish screenwriters
Spanish ice hockey players